Taltala High School is a Bengali co-ed high school. It was established in the year 1910 by the Government of West Bengal. The school enrolls over 700 children, aged 4 to 18. It is located in the Entally neighborhood of the city of Kolkata in the Indian state of West Bengal.

The school consists of two buildings and is equipped with a laboratory. The school is open for both boys and girls in two separate shifts (girls during the morning and boys during the afternoon).

See also
 Taltola (Vidhan Sabha constituency)
Taltala

References

Primary schools in West Bengal
High schools and secondary schools in Kolkata
Educational institutions established in 1910
1910 establishments in India